Mugdrum Island lies in the Firth of Tay, offshore from the town of Newburgh, Fife, in the east of Scotland.

Geography
Mugdrum is low-lying and reedy, with the "North Deep" and "South Deep" channels on either side of the island.

History
Mugdrum's name is from muc-dhruim, the Scottish Gaelic for hog-back. The name is also applied to Mugdrum House, to the west of Newburgh in Fife, on the south coast of the Tay opposite the island.

The reeds were once harvested for thatching and for protecting potatoes during transshipment. Until 1926, a  farm grew cereals, potatoes and turnips in the island's alluvial soil. It is now a nature reserve under the stewardship of the Tay Valley Wildfowlers' Association.

The Laing Museum in Newburgh preserves the stuffed body of a two-headed kitten born in the 19th century on Mugdrum.

See also
 List of outlying islands of Scotland

References

External links

Nature reserves in Scotland
Islands of the Tay
Protected areas of Fife
Uninhabited islands of Fife